The Relatives is a 2021 Russian tragicomedy road film directed by Ilya Aksyonov. It was released on February 11, 2021, by Sony Pictures Productions and Releasing.

Plot 
The film tells about a man who gets the opportunity to fulfill his dream and goes with his family to the Grushinsky festival to perform there with his song. Exciting adventures and trials await them along the way.

Cast 
 Sergey Burunov as Pavel Kornaukhov, a father
 Irina Pegova as Natalia Kornaukhova, a mother
 Semyon Treskunov as Alexander 'Sanya' Karnaukhov, a son
 Elizaveta Gyrdymova as Anastasia 'Nastya' Kornaukhova, a daughter
 Nikita Pavlenko as Bob Karnaukhov, a son
 Katerina Bekker as Sonya, Sanya's wife
 Anna Ukolova as Olga Savostina, Pavel's school love
 Sergey Shakurov as Mikhail Kornaukhov, a grandfather
 Pavel Vorozhtsov as an invalid
 Dmitriy Rusakov as a salesperson of a music store
 Eleonora Ilchenko as Zoya, aunt 
 Larisa Krupina as Masha, aunt

Production

Filming
In the summer of 2020, they filmed in the Moscow Oblast and Tver Oblast.

Release
On February 8, 2021, the premiere of the film took place at the cinema "Karo 11 October" in Moscow.

The film was released in the Russian Federation on February 11, 2021, by Sony Pictures Productions and Releasing.

References

External links 
 

2021 films
2020s Russian-language films
2021 comedy-drama films
2020s road comedy-drama films
Russian road comedy-drama films